Borghetto Santo Spirito is a comune (municipality) in the Province of Savona in the Italian region Liguria, located about  southwest of Genoa and about  southwest of Savona.

Borghetto Santo Spirito borders the following municipalities: Boissano, Ceriale, Loano, and Toirano.

The town is noted in the general context of the Riviera as one of the examples of urban explosion, with tall apartment buildings built in the 1960s and 1970s mainly near the shore. Borghetto Santo Spirito means "Little Town of the Holy Spirit" and is crossed by the stream Varatella. Worthy of note are the Borelli Castle above the Monte Piccaro overlooking the Ligurian Sea, the Sanctuary of Saint Anthony of Padua with a relic of the saint, the Church of Saint Matthew the Apostle, and the small Pineland Hill in the inland of the Comune with luxurious housing units. Like all the coastal comuni of the province of Savona it is crossed every year by the Milan - San Remo cycling race.

Notable people from Borghetto Santo Spirito
 Ugo Magnetto, football player

References

External links
 Official website

Cities and towns in Liguria